HD 149382 is a hot subdwarf star in the constellation of Ophiuchus with an apparent visual magnitude of 8.943. This is too faint to be seen with the naked eye even under ideal conditions, although it can be viewed with a small telescope.

This is the brightest known B-type subdwarf star with a stellar classification of B5 VI. It is generating energy through the thermonuclear fusion of helium at its core (triple-alpha process). The effective temperature of the star's outer envelope is about 35,500 K, giving it the characteristic blue-white hue of a B-type star. Although only about one seventh the diameter of the Sun, it radiates about 25 times as much due to its high temperature.  HD 149382 has a visual companion located at an angular separation of 1 arcsecond.

In 2009, a substellar companion, perhaps even a superjovian planet, was announced orbiting the star. This candidate object was estimated to have nearly half the mass of the Sun. In 2011, this discovery was thrown into doubt when an independent team of astronomers were unable to confirm the detection. Their observations rule out a companion with a mass greater than Jupiter orbiting with a period of less than 28 days.

See also 

 List of brown dwarfs

References

External links 
 http://exoplanet.eu/planet.php?p1=HD%20149382&p2=b
 http://simbad.u-strasbg.fr/simbad/sim-id?Ident=HD%20149382b

Ophiuchus (constellation)
149382
Hypothetical planetary systems
B-type subdwarfs
081145
Durchmusterung objects